This is a list of electors (members of the Electoral College) who cast ballots to elect the President of the United States and Vice President of the United States in the 2012 presidential election. There are 538 electors from the 50 states and the District of Columbia. While every state except Nebraska and Maine chooses the electors by statewide vote, many states require that one elector be designated for each congressional district. Except where otherwise noted, such designations refer to the elector's residence in that district rather than election by the voters of the district.

Alabama
Electors: 9, pledged to vote for Mitt Romney for President and Paul Ryan for Vice President 
 James T. Waggoner state senator
 Will Sellers
 Terry Lathan
 Susan Neuwein
 Robert Fincher
 Lynn Robinson
 James Elbert Peters
 Edward S. Allen
 Robert A. Cusanelli

Alaska

Electors: 3, pledged to vote for Mitt Romney for President and Paul Ryan for Vice President
 Kristie Babcock of Kenai
 Kathleen Miller of Fairbanks
 Chris L. Nelson of Anchorage

Arizona

Electors: 11, pledged to vote for Mitt Romney for President and Paul Ryan for Vice President 
 Don M. Ascoli, Arizona Republican Party county chair for Gila County
 Malcolm Barrett Jr., Yavapai County Republican Committee Chairman
 Paul Gilbert
 Robert Haney
 Leona Johnston
 Gregory Mendoza,  Gila River Indian Community Governor
 Steve Montenegro, Arizona House of Representatives Speaker Pro Tempore
 Kristine Morrissey
 Thomas Morrissey, Arizona Republican Party Chair 
 John D. Rhodes
 C. T. Wright

Arkansas
Electors: 6, pledged to vote for Mitt Romney for President and Paul Ryan for Vice President 
 Larry Bailey of Hot Springs
 Jonathan Barnett of Siloam Springs, State Representative
 Reta Hamilton of Bella Vista, Member Republican National Committee 
 Robin Lundstrum of Springdale
 Benny Speaks of Mountain Home
 Doyle Webb of Little Rock,  Arkansas Republican Party Chairman

California

Electors: 55, pledged to Barack Obama and Joe Biden
 Michael Williams Adams 
 Alisha Aguilar 
 Maria Teresa Becerra 
 Janine Vivienne Bera 
 Karen Chang 
 Aaron Samuel Conaway 
 Greg Conger 
 Raymond Cordova 
 Mollie Culver 
 Dennis Donohue 
 Sandy Emberland 
 Ernesto Encinas 
 John Freidenrich 
 Felipe Fuentes, member, California State Assembly
 Patricia W. Garamendi 
 Bobby Glaser 
 Dolores Clara Huerta 
 William H. Kysella, Jr. 
 Laura Lee 
 Daniel Leroux 
 Dave Low 
 Mark Macarro, Chair Pechanga Band of Luiseno Mission Indians 
 Jane Morrison 
 Donald Mullen 
 Chris M. Myers 
 Anu Natarajan, Fremont City Councilmember 
 Sandy L. Nixon 
 Ricardo Roybal Olivarez 
 Louis Paulson 
 Geoffrey Pete 
 Bonnie Burns Price 
 Andre Quintero, Mayor of El Monte
 Michael Ray 
 Terry Reardon 
 Brooke Reed 
 Gwen Regalia, former Mayor of Walnut Creek 
 Meriam Louise Reynosa 
 Gregory Lucas Rodriguez 
 Alexandra Rooker 
 Gary Rotto 
 Alfonso Sanchez 
 Barbara Schraeger 
 John Harold Simpson 
 Laurie Stalnaker 
 Ranada Stephenson 
 Xiaoguang Sun 
 Maeley Lock Tom 
 Kyriakos Tsakopoulos 
 Christopher Tumbeiro 
 Ernest Joseph Vasti 
 Ruben Antonio Villalobos 
 Dean E. Vogel, President, California Teachers Association 
 Diane Watson, former U.S. Representative
 Sanford Weiner 
 Steven Ray Young

Colorado

Electors: 9, pledged to Barack Obama and Joe Biden
Anthony Eric Graves of Denver
Terry Phillips of Louisville
Gilbert Ortiz of Pueblo
Deborah Pilch of Greeley
Thomas E. Cronin of Colorado Springs
Laurence W. Steele of Aurora
Richard O'Dean Swain of Lakewood
Alvin D. Rivera of Pueblo
Polly Baca of Denver, past Chair, Democratic Party of Colorado

Connecticut

Electors: 7, pledged to Barack Obama and Joe Biden
Ronald C. Schurin of Mansfield
Mildred Torres-Ferguson of Meriden
James C. Ezzes of Westport
Larry Pleasant Town Council member of Bloomfield
Jason Jakubowski of West Hartford 
Carmen Colon of Bridgeport
Jacqueline James of New Haven

Delaware

Electors: 3, pledged to Barack Obama and Joe Biden
Peter Keegan
Abby Betts
Delores McLamb

District of Columbia

Electors: 3, pledged to Barack Obama and Joe Biden
Yvette M. Alexander DC Councilmember
Donald R. Dinan
William P. Lightfoot

Florida

Electors: 29, pledged to Barack Obama and Joe Biden
Lynette Acosta 
Burt Aaronson 
Scott Arceneaux, former director of the Louisiana State Democratic Party 
T. Wayne Bailey 
Carol M. Bartleson 
Leon Belton 
Tim Bottcher 
Alan Clendenin 
Ana Cruz 
Buddy Dyer, Mayor of Orlando 
Joe Faulk 
Rita Fernandino 
Joe Gibbons, Member, Florida House of Representatives 
Audrey Gibson, member, Florida Senate 
Dina Heffernan 
Vonzelle Johnson 
Luis Lauredo 
Elena McCollough 
Amy Mercado 
Vivian Mitchell 
Jean Monestime, Commissioner, Miami-Dade County 
Susannah Randolph 
Rod Smith, Chair Florida Democratic Party 
Justin Spiller 
Bob Troy 
Kirk Wagar 
Ashley M. Walker 
Alan Williams, Member, Florida House of Representatives 
Jeanette Wynn

Georgia

Electors: 16, pledged to Mitt Romney and Paul Ryan
Teresa Jeter Chappell 
James Randolph Evans, Member, Republican National Committee 
Sue P. Everhart, Chair, Georgia Republican Party
Darrell L. Galloway 
Linda D. Herren, member, Republican National Committee 
Kathy S. Hildebrand 
Hsiao Lung Ho 
Anne Ware Lewis 
Kelly Lynn Loeffler
Robert Luther Mayzes 
Lautoria Estes Morgan 
Eugene E. Pearson, Jr. 
George Ervin Perdue, III, former Governor 
Frank B. Strickland 
Eric J. Tanenblatt 
Julianne Elizabeth Thompson

Hawaii

Electors: 4, pledged to Barack Obama and Joe Biden
Michael Golojuch. Sr. 
Marina Schwartz 
Debbie Shimizu 
Marie Dolores (Dolly) Strazar, member, Democratic National Committee

Idaho

Electors: 4, pledged to Mitt Romney and Paul Ryan
Travis Hawkes, of Meridian. Mitt Romney's Idaho Finance co-chair
Teresa Luna, of Boise
Jason Risch, of Boise
Damond Watkins, of Idaho Falls, member, Republican National Committee

Illinois

Electors: 20, pledged to Barack Obama and Joe Biden
 Carrie Austin, Alderman, City of Chicago
 Julia Kennedy Beckman
 Barb Brown
 Christine Cegelis
 Ashley Sachdeva 
 Barbara Flynn Currie, Member, Illinois House of Representatives
 John P. Daley
 Vera Davis
 James A. Deleo, former member, Illinois Senate
 Lynn Foster
 Lauren Beth Gash, former member, Illinois House of Representatives
 Mark Guethle
 Debbie Halvorson, former US Representative
 Don Johnston
 Shirley McCombs
 Andrew R. Madigan
 Ricardo Muñoz, Alderman, City of Chicago
 William Marovit
 John Nelson
 Toni Preckwinkle, President of the Cook County Board
 Nancy Shepherdson

Indiana 

Electors: 11 pledged to Mitt Romney and Paul Ryan

Robert Grand, of Indianapolis President Indiana Works 
Eric Holcomb, of Indianapolis.  Chair Indiana Republican Party 
Susan Lightle, of Greenfield
Scott Molin, replacement for Beverly Bush, of Kirklin
Jamey Noel, of Jeffersonville
William Ruppel, of North Manchester. Past member Indiana House of Representatives 
Steve Shine, of Fort Wayne 
William "Bill" Springer, of Sullivan 
Pearl Swanigan, of Indianapolis 
Charles Williams, of Valparaiso
Kyle Hupfer, of Pendleton

Iowa 
Electors: 6 pledged to Barack Obama and Joe Biden

Glen Salisberry
William Gluba Mayor of Davenport 
Dale Creech 
Theodore Herrick, of Jefferson
Marc Wallace, of Des Moines
Jan Shirley

Kansas
Electors: 6, pledged to Mitt Romney and Paul Ryan:

Amanda Adkins, Chair, Kansas Republican Party
Kelly Arnold, Member, Republican National Committee
Jeff Colyer, Lieutenant Governor
Randy Duncan
Todd Tiahrt Former Member of Congress
Helen Van Etten, Member Republican National Committee

Kentucky
Electors: 8, pledged to Mitt Romney and Paul Ryan:

Wilma W. Cooper of Hopkinsville, KY; elector for Kentucky's 1st congressional district
Mary Ann Baron of Greensburg, KY; elector for Kentucky's 2nd congressional district
Lawrence E. Cox of Louisville, KY; elector for Kentucky's 3rd congressional district
Kevin Sell of Alexandria, KY; elector for Kentucky's 4th congressional district
Robert L. Mitchell of Corbin, KY; elector for Kentucky's 5th congressional district
Dave Disponett of Lawrenceburg, KY; elector for Kentucky's 6th congressional district
Mira Ball of Lexington, KY; elector at-large
Terry E. Forcht of Corbin, KY; elector at-large

Louisiana
Electors: 8, pledged to Mitt Romney and Paul Ryan:

 Jimmy C. Allen
 Michael R. Bayham, Jr.
 Harold O. Coates
 Christian J. Gil
 Legena "Gena" Gore
 Louis S. Gurvich, Jr. of New Orleans
 Garrett C. Monti of Luling
 S. Scott Wilfong of Baton Rouge

Maine

Electors: 4, pledged to Barack Obama and Joe Biden

 Diane Denk
 Jill Duson, Member Portland City Council
 Craig Hickman
 Marianne Stevens, Vice Chair, State Democratic Party

Maryland

Electors: 10, pledged to Barack Obama and Joe Biden
 Kumar Barve, Member, Maryland House of Delegates
 Jonathan K. Branch
 Tashea Brodgins
 Helen L. Dale
 Cheryl Everman
 Richard Madaleno, Jr., Member, Maryland State Senate
 Gary W. Michael
 Joseline Peña-Melnyk, Member, Maryland House of Delegates
 Beth Swoap, Secretary, Maryland Democratic State Committee
 Alonzo Washington

Massachusetts

Electors: 11, pledged to Barack Obama and Joe Biden
 Sandi E. Bagley
 Janet M. Beyer
 James Eliseo DiTullio of Boston
 Louis A. Elisa, II
 Paul J. Giorgio
 Candy Glazer
 Susan M. Kennedy
 Mike Lake
 James McGowan
 Karen L. Payne
 Diane M. Saxe, Member Democratic National Committee

Michigan

Electors: 16, pledged to Barack Obama and Joe Biden
Cindy Estrada of Whitmore Lake
Steve Cook of Lake Odessa
Dorothy Johnson of Kincheloe
Marge Faville of Muskegon
Marion Vanderveen of Grand Rapids
Toni Sessoms of Weidman
Norwood Jewell of Davison
Jess Minks of Buchanan
Howard Pizzo of Lansing
Joanne Murphy of Brighton
Peggy Ciaramitaro of Roseville representing the 9th Congressional District
James Winne of Washington Twp. representing the 10th Congressional District
Walter Sobczak of Novi
Jane Ahern of Dearborn
Hilliard Hampton of Inkster
Edna Bell of Detroit

Minnesota

Electors: 10, pledged to Barack Obama and Joe Biden
Gabe Aderhold of Edina
Lucy Buckner of Burnsville
Jettie Ann Hill of Minneapolis
Dee Long of Minnetonka, former Speaker of the Minnesota House of Representatives
Joe Moren of Hibbing
Al Patton of Sartell
Shanti Shah of Eden Prairie
Russ Warren of Mounds View
Janet Weir of Mankato
Paul Wright of Hutchinson

Mississippi

Electors: 6, pledged to Mitt Romney and Paul Ryan
Austin Barbour - nephew of former Mississippi governor Haley Barbour, and finance director for the Romney campaign.
Ricky Jay Calhoon
Charles Cannada (Appointed to fill the vacancy created when Wirt A. Yerger, Jr., the first state chairman of the Mississippi Republican Party, did not attend.) Private investor and former MCI executive.
William Randolph James
William D. "Billy" Mounger - former Reagan advisor, and fundraiser to former Senator Trent Lott.
Billy R. Powell - Secretary of the Mississippi Ethics Commission.

Missouri

Electors: 10, pledged to Mitt Romney and Paul Ryan
Mavis C. Busiek 
Stanley Cox, Member, Missouri House of Representatives
Matthew G. Gertsner 
Robert L. Green 
John Judd 
Michael Koop 
R. Layne Morrill 
Penelope Z. Quigg 
David Stokes 
Kurt Witzel

Montana

Electors: 3, pledged to Mitt Romney and Paul Ryan
Thelma Baker 
John Brenden, member, Montana Senate
Errol Galt, Member, Republican National Committee

Nebraska

Electors: 5, pledged to Mitt Romney and Paul Ryan
Mary Crawford 
Joe Hampton 
Mick Jensen 
Kay Orr, former governor 
Arlene Steier

Nevada

Electors: 6, pledged to Barack Obama and Joe Biden
Samuel Lieberman
John Ponticello
Marty Ann McGarry Nevada Democratic Party county chair for Carson City
Randy Soltero
Rose McKinney-James
Theresa Benitez-Thompson

New Hampshire

Electors: 4, pledged to Barack Obama and Joe Biden
James Demers of Concord
Joanne Dowdell of Portsmouth, Member, Democratic National Committee
Mary Rauh of New Castle
C. Arthur Soucy of Manchester

New Jersey

Electors: 14, pledged to Barack Obama and Joe Biden
Frank Argote-Freyre
Marion G. Costanza
Suzanne Marshall Discher
Christopher Irving 
Jeffrey Laurenti 
John J. McCarthy 
Ileana Montes 
Ida Ochoteco 
Paul Penna 
Robert F. Renaud 
Virginia N. Scott 
Henry G. Sykes 
Philip Thigpen
Beth E. Timberman, Freeholder Salem County

New Mexico

Electors: 5, pledged to Barack Obama and Joe Biden
Elizabeth "Lisa" Chavez 
Katherine "Kat" Duran 
Tracy Goodluck, Chair Native American Caucus of the Democratic Party of New Mexico
Pamelya Herndon 
David Thomson

New York

Electors: 29, pledged to Barack Obama and Joe Biden
Scott Adams 
Anne Marie Anzalone 
Steve Bellone, Suffolk County Executive 
Byron Brown, Mayor of Buffalo 
Karim Camara, State Assemblyman 
Mario Cilento, President of the New York State AFL-CIO 
Sheila Comar, New York State Democratic Party Executive Committee Chair 
Walter Cooper 
Bill de Blasio, New York City Public Advocate 
Ruben Diaz, Jr., Bronx Borough President 
Thomas DiNapoli, State Comptroller 
Robert Duffy, Lieutenant Governor 
Emily Giske 
George Gresham, President of the 1199SEIU 
Peter Harckham, Majority Leader of the Westchester County Board of Legislators 
Hakeem Jeffries, United States Congressman-elect and State Assemblyman 
Ken Jenkins, Chair of the Westchester County Board of Legislators 
Gerald D. Jennings, Mayor of Albany 
Virginia Kee 
Stephanie Miner, Mayor of Syracuse 
Joseph Morelle, State Assemblyman 
Félix Ortiz, State Assemblyman 
Christine C. Quinn, New York City Council Speaker 
Eric Schneiderman, State Attorney General 
Sheldon Silver, State Assembly Speaker 
Archie Spigner 
Irene Stein, Tompkins County Democratic Party Chair 
Scott Stringer, Manhattan Borough President 
Keith L.T. Wright, State Assemblyman

North Carolina

Electors: 15, pledged to Mitt Romney and Paul Ryan
Don Abernathy 
Dodie Allen 
Charles Barrett 
Michael Esser 
Barbara Hines 
Robert Levy 
Paul Penney 
Felice Pete 
James Art Pope, Former Member, North Carolina House of Representatives 
James Proctor 
David Ruden 
Mary Jo Shepherd 
William Shillito 
Garry Terry 
Ashley Woolard

North Dakota

Electors: 3, pledged to Mitt Romney and Paul Ryan
Layton Freborg of Underwood, Member, North Dakota Senate
Mary Lee of Bismarck
David Nething of Jamestown, Member, North Dakota Senate

Ohio

Electors: 18, pledged to Barack Obama and Joe Biden
Ann Block 
Sarah Brown-Clark 
Grace Anne Cherrington 
Michael Friedman 
William J. Healy II, Mayor Canton 
Tracy Heard, Member, Ohio House of Representatives 
Cathina Hourani 
Pernel Jones, Jr., Member, Cuyahoga County Council 
Wade Kapszukiewicz 
Ryan Kolegar 
Constance Lighthall 
Kevin Malecek 
Mark Owens 
Chris Redfern, Chair, Ohio Democratic Party 
Ted Strickland, Former Governor 
Daniel Traicoff 
Jeremy Van Meter 
William Young

Oklahoma

Electors: 7, pledged to Mitt Romney and Paul Ryan
Jason Cowen 
Duane Crumbacher 
David Holt, Member, Oklahoma State Senate 
Joe Peters 
Mark Thomas 
Lawrence A. Williamson 
Lynn Windel

Oregon

Electors: 7, pledged to Barack Obama and Joe Biden
Mike Bohan of Beaverton
Shirley Cairns of Oakland
Joe Smith of Portland
Michael Miles of Grants Pass
Roy Pulvers of Portland, replacement for Frank Dixon
Sam Sappington of Albany
Meredith Wood Smith of Portland, Chair Democratic Party of Oregon

Pennsylvania

Electors: 20, pledged to Barack Obama and Joe Biden
Mark L. Alderman of Montgomery County
Cindy M. Bass of Philadelphia County
Richard Bloomingdale of Dauphin County
C. Kim Bracey of York County
James R. Burn, Jr. of Allegheny County
Jay Costa of Allegheny County
Frank Dermody of Allegheny County
Rich Fitzgerald of Allegheny County
Penny Gerber of Montgomery County
Amanda Green Hawkins of Allegheny County
Vincent J. Hughes of Philadelphia County
Susan Golden Jacobson of Philadelphia County
Clifford B. Levine of Allegheny County
Robert McCord of Montgomery County
Michael Nutter of Philadelphia County
Lazar M. Palnick of Allegheny County
Roxanne G. Pauline of Lackawanna County
Jose Rosado of Lehigh County
Cynthia D. Shapira of Allegheny County
Josh Shapiro of Montgomery County

Rhode Island

Electors: 4, pledged to Barack Obama and Joe Biden
Marvin L. Abney of Newport
Emily A. Marajian of Providence
L. Susan Weiner of East Greenwich
Mark S. Weiner of East Greenwich, Former State Party Chair, Democratic fundraiser

South Carolina

Electors: 9, pledged to Mitt Romney and Paul Ryan
Bruce Chadwick Connelly Chair, South Carolina Republican Party
Drew McKissick Parliamentarian, South Carolina Republican Party
Cynthia F. Costa, Member, Republican National Committee
Randall S. Page
Janice C. McCord
Betty Sheppard Poe
Sandra R. Stroman
Roy Rex Lindsey III
James Edward Jerow

South Dakota

Electors: 3, pledged to Mitt Romney and Paul Ryan
Dennis Daugaard, Governor
Matt Michels, Lt. Governor
Marty Jackley, State Attorney General

Tennessee

Electors: 11, pledged to Mitt Romney and Paul Ryan
Jennie T. McCabe (At-large)
David Snodgrass (At-large), Chair Tennessee Republican Party
Scott Niswonger (First Congressional District)
Joe Bailey (Second Congressional District),  Vice Mayor, City of Knoxville
Jerry Sink (Third Congressional District), Tennessee Finance Leadership Team for Mitt Romney
Andy Adams (Fourth Congressional District)
Bob Rial (Fifth Congressional District), Dickson County Mayor
Ruth Hagerty (Sixth Congressional District)
Kurt Holbert (Seventh Congressional District), State Committeman
Annabel Woodall (Eighth Congressional District), State Committeewoman
Robert Bradley Martin (Ninth Congressional District), Former Tennessee legislator

Texas

Electors: 38, pledged to Mitt Romney and Paul Ryan
Keith Rothra
Butch Davis, Republican Party of Texas Parliamentarian
Tim McCord
Clinton Evetts
Benny Gordon
Steve Jessup
Paul Bettencort
Walter Wilkerson, Jr.
Bonnie Lugo
Terri Flow
Georgia Scott
Kaye Moreno
Jane Juett
David Stone
Sandra Cararas
Mary Holmesly
Matthew Johnson
Nelda Eppes, Republican Party of Texas Sergeant-At-Arms
Ruth Schiermeyer
Johnny Lovejoy, II
Patti Johnson
Tim Turner
Jennifer Weaver
Royal Smith
Linda Rogers
Jean McIver
Betty Stiles
Texas Moore
Richard Bernhard
Thom Wilkins
Bill Fairbrother
Mary Ann Collins
Loren Byers
Samuel Owens
Billie Zimmerman
Daniel Whitton
Steve Munisteri, Republican Party of Texas Chairman
Carolyn Hodges

Utah

Electors: 6, pledged to Mitt Romney and Paul Ryan
John Swallow; at-large elector
Kyle Hicks ; representing Utah's 4th Congressional District
Stan Lockhart; representing Utah's 3rd Congressional District
Thomas Wright; representing Utah's 2nd Congressional District
Fred Lampropoulos; at-large elector
Terry Camp; representing Utah's 1st Congressional District

Vermont

Electors: 3, pledged to Barack Obama and Joe Biden
Sherry Merrick of Post Mills
William Sander of Jeffersonville
Kevin Christie of Hartford

Virginia

Electors: 13, pledged to Barack Obama and Joe Biden

Sandra W. Brandt
Terry Carroll Frye
Gary W. Crawford
Christopher M. Daniel, Jr.
Edna N. Frady
Janyce N. Hedetniemi
Susan Johnston Rowland
Evan D. Macbeth
Judy L. Mastrangeli
Ben Ragsdale, Jr.
Melanie B. Salyer
Betty L. Squire
Anita A. White

Washington

Electors: 12, pledged to Barack Obama and Joe Biden
Grifynn Marley Clay of Snohomish, WA; elector for Washington's 1st congressional district
Dave W. Gossett of Mountlake Terrace, WA; elector for Washington's 2nd congressional district, Member, Snohomish County Council
Kathleen A. Lawrence of Vancouver, WA; elector for Washington's 3rd congressional district
George B. Fearing of Kennewick, WA; elector for Washington's 4th congressional district
Rick Lloyd of Spokane Valley, WA; elector for Washington's 5th congressional district
Gail Kirk of Tacoma, WA; elector for Washington's 6th congressional district
Maria Ehsan of Seattle, WA; elector for Washington's 7th congressional district
Elizabeth Satiacum of Olympia, WA; elector for Washington's 8th congressional district
Georgia Spencer of Seattle, WA; elector for Washington's 9th congressional district
Harvey Brooks of University Place, WA; elector for Washington's 10th congressional district
Heather Fralick of Shoreline, WA; at-large elector
Alec Stephens of Seattle, WA; at-large elector

West Virginia

Electors: 5, pledged to Mitt Romney and Paul Ryan
Betty Ireland
John McCuskey
Sarah Minear
Mick Staton
David Tyson

Wisconsin

Electors: 10, pledged to Barack Obama and Joe Biden
Peter Barca
Fred Risser
Gary Hawley
Frederick P. Kessler
Lori Compas
Marcia Steele
Christine Bremer Muggli
Diana Miller
JoCasta Zamarripa
Mahlon Mitchell

Wyoming

Electors: 3, pledged to Mitt Romney and Paul Ryan
Ron Micheli of Fort Bridger
Margaret Parry
Susan Thomas

References

https://www.archives.gov/federal-register/electoral-college/2012-certificates/

 
United States presidential electors
2012
Presidential electors,2012